Jim Brandenburg (born December 10, 1935) is an American retired college basketball coach.

Brandenburg is currently the third winningest coach in the history of Wyoming Cowboys basketball and was inducted into the Wyoming Athletics Hall of Fame in September 2000.

Head coaching record

Award and honors
 Inducted into the University of Wyoming Athletics Hall of Fame in 2000.
 Three time Western Athletic Conference coach of the year (1980–81, 1981–82, 1985–86).
 Eastman Kodak NCAA Division I District 13 Coach of the year in 1986.

References

1935 births
Living people
College men's basketball head coaches in the United States
Colorado State Rams baseball players
High school basketball coaches in Colorado
Junior college men's basketball coaches in the United States
Montana Grizzlies basketball coaches
San Diego State Aztecs men's basketball coaches
Wyoming Cowboys basketball coaches
Place of birth missing (living people)